The Librazhd Sector was a corps-sized defensive sector of the Royal Italian Army in Albania during World War II that defended against an offensive during the invasion of Yugoslavia.

Notes

References
 

Military units and formations of Italy in World War II